The Roland D-05 is a synthesizer first manufactured in 2017. It is a smaller version of the Roland D-50 which was produced in 1987.     The D-05 is part of the Roland's Boutique range of new and recreated synths. This particular Boutique module has additional functionality compared to its bigger brother.   There is the addition of a Micro USB port that MIDI and audio from the unit can both be transmitted to and from a connected computer.

Extra features
Extra features include an arpeggiator and a 64 step sequencer, sequence shuffle and has gate timing along with tempo and patch changes.

Portability
The unit can be powered by batteries or from the USB port. Along with the optional K25m module and utilizing the D-05's built in speaker, it can be made into a self-contained, highly portable synthesizer.

References

External links
Roland Product Page

JX-10|D-50
Polyphonic synthesizers